The Battle of Ambarawa was a battle between the recently created Indonesian Army and the British Army that occurred between 20 October and 15 December 1945 in Ambarawa, Indonesia.

Prelude
On 20 October 1945, Allied troops under the command of Brigadier Bethell landed in Semarang to disarm Japanese troops and liberate POWs still detained in concentration camps in Central Java. Initially, the troops were welcomed in the area, with Central Java's governor Wongsonegoro agreeing to provide them with food and other necessities in return for the Allies' promise to respect Indonesia's sovereignty and independence. The Netherlands Indies Civil Administration (NICA) were also in Semarang, and welcomed the British presence.

However, when Allied and NICA troops began freeing and arming freed Dutch POWs in Ambarawa and Magelang, many locals were angered. Relations were further ruined when the Allies began disarming members of the Indonesian Army. Indonesian troops under the command of Lieutenant Colonel M. Sarbini began besieging Allied troops stationed in Magelang in reprisal for their attempted disarmament. Indonesian president Sukarno intervened in the situation to calm tensions, and the Allies secretly left Magelang to their stronghold in Ambarawa. Sarbini's regiment followed the Allies in pursuit, and was later joined by other Indonesian troops from Ambarawa, Suruh, and Surakarta. Allied troops were later driven out of the nearby village of Jambu by the combined force of the Indonesian Army.

At the village of Ngipik, Allied troops were once again forced to retreat by the Indonesian Army, after attempting to establish control over two villages around Ambarawa. Indonesian troops under the command of Lieutenant Colonel Isdiman tried to free the two villages, but Isdiman was killed in action before reinforcements arrived. Commander of the 5th Banyumas Division, Colonel Soedirman, vowed to avenge Isdiman's death and called in reinforcements to besiege Allied positions in Central Java. Unknown to his servicemen, he had been elected Commander of the Armed Forces on 12 November in absentia, as he was still with his division.

Battle
On the morning of 23 November 1945, Indonesian troops began firing on Allied troops stationed in Ambarawa. A counterattack by the Allies forced the Indonesian Army to retreat to the village of Bedono.

On 11 December 1945, Soedirman held a meeting with various commanders of the Indonesian Army. The next day at 4:30 AM, the Indonesian Army launched an assault on the Allies in Ambarawa. Indonesian artillery pounded Allied positions, which were later overrun by infantry. When the Semarang-Ambarawa highway was captured by Indonesian troops, Soedirman immediately ordered his forces to cut off the supply routes of the remaining Allied troops by using a pincer maneuver. The battle ended four days later on 15 December 1945, when Indonesia succeeded in regaining control over Ambarawa and the Allies retreated to Semarang.

Aftermath
Just three days after the victory, Soedirman was promoted to Major General and his election as Commander of the Armed Forces, retroactive to 12 November, was confirmed, succeeding Oerip Soemohardjo, the ad interim chief for the forces, who was appointed chief of staff.

The Palagan Ambarawa Monument in Ambarawa was erected in memory of the battle. The battle's anniversary is also celebrated nationwide as Indonesian Army Day (Hari Juang Kartika TNI Angkatan Darat), a day of celebration of the first ever victory of the young army in the Indonesian National Revolution.

References

Bibliography
 
 
 

Ambarawa
1945 in Indonesia
Ambarawa
Ambarawa
Battles of the Indonesian National Revolution
History of Central Java
October 1945 events in Asia
November 1945 events in Asia
December 1945 events in Asia
20th-century revolutions
Dutch East Indies
History of Indonesia by period
Aftermath of World War II in Indonesia
Conflicts in 1945
1945 in the Dutch East Indies
Wikipedia categories named after wars
Wars involving Indonesia
Wars involving the Netherlands
Wars of independence
Indonesia–Netherlands relations